At least three vessels in the Age of Sail have borne the name John Palmer:

 was launched at Plymouth and made voyages to the East Indies and South America before becoming a whaler and making five whaling voyages between 1823 and 1841, when she was broken up
 was built at Calcutta and made one voyage under charter to the British East India Company, wrecking with the loss of all hands in 1814 on the return leg of a second voyage to India
 was wrecked, with loss of life, in 1818

Ship names